Muirigo is a slum in Kenya. A Muirigo Primary School exists. Muirigo belongs to Kasarani.  
Other informal settlements in the Nairobi area include Huruma, Kiambiu, Korogocho, Mukuru and Kibera.

References

Suburbs of Nairobi
Slums in Kenya